"Night in Motion" is a song recorded by German act U96, released in 1993 as the second single from their second album, Replugged (1993). It was successful on the charts in Europe, peaking within the top 10 in Austria, Finland, Germany, Lithuania and Sweden. On the Eurochart Hot 100, it reached number 25 in October 1993. Outside Europe, the song was a huge hit in Israel, peaking at number-one in August 1993.

Critical reception
Raùl Cairo from Pan-European magazine Music & Media wrote that the song "has a strong potential to cross over to more pop oriented audiences".

Track listing
 CD maxi, Europe (1993)
"Night in Motion" (Video Version) – 3:19
"Night in Motion" (12" Version) – 4:54
"Night in Motion" (12" Version 2) – 5:19
"Night in Motion" (70's Mix) – 5:13 

 CD maxi, Germany (1993)
"Night in Motion" (Bass Bumpers Remix) – 5:57
"Brainkiller" – 4:32

Charts

Weekly charts

Year-end charts

References

 

1993 singles
1993 songs
English-language German songs
Number-one singles in Israel
Song recordings produced by Alex Christensen
Songs written by Alex Christensen
U96 songs